Gibraltar elects on the national level a legislature. The Gibraltar Parliament has 17 members, all elected for a four-year term in one constituency with each voter getting to vote for their selection of ten candidates. Gibraltar forms a single constituency but voters have only ten votes.  Hence the electoral bloc with the most votes will normally get ten seats and the runners up seven.

Eligibility to vote

People must be qualified to vote and listed on the Register of Electors in order to cast a ballot.

British nationals (this includes all forms of British nationality) who have lived in Gibraltar for a continuous period of six months and who intend to live in Gibraltar either permanently or indefinitely are entitled to register to vote in general elections to the Gibraltar Parliament if they will be aged 18 or over on polling day.

British, European Union and qualifying Commonwealth citizens (those who have a permit or certificate to enter/remain in Gibraltar, or not require such a permit/certificate on the date of their electoral registration application) living in Gibraltar are entitled to register to vote in elections to the European Parliament if they will be aged 18 or over on polling day.

British nationals and Commonwealth citizens living outside Gibraltar can register as an 'overseas voter' and vote in elections to the European Parliament provided that they were on the Register of Electors in Gibraltar within the past 15 years (the 15 years period begins when they no longer appeared in the Register of Electors, not the date they moved abroad). For British nationals and Commonwealth citizens who moved abroad before they were 18 years old, they can still qualify for registration as an 'overseas elector' in elections to the European Parliament, with the 15 years period calculated from the date their parent(s)/guardian ceased to appear in the Register of Electors in Gibraltar.

Latest elections

General elections to the Gibraltar Parliament (House of Assembly)
Below is a series of results from elections to the Gibraltar Parliament and its predecessor, the House of Assembly (which was created upon the publication of the Gibraltar Constitution 1969).  Elections take place roughly every four years, 17 members (15 before 2007) are elected at each election, using partial bloc voting. Each voter has ten votes (eight before 2007) meaning that parties usually stand ten candidates, and the winning party is that which manages to get all their candidates elected.

1969 election

This election took place on 30 July 1969.

AACR - 7 members
IWBP - 5 members
Independents (Isola Group) - 3 members

1972 election

AACR - 52%, 8 members
IWBP - 7 members

1976 election

AACR - 75.3%, 8 members
GDM - 4 seats
Independents - 3 members (Robert Peliza, Maurice Xiberras and Peter Isola)

1980 election

AACR - 8 members
DPBG - 6 members
GSLP - 1 members

1984 election

AACR - 44.4%, 8 members
GSLP - 34.2%, 7 members
DPBG - 18.9%, 0 members
Others - 2.5%, 0 members

1988 election

GSLP - 58.2%, 8 members
AACR - 29.4%, 7 members
Independent Democrats - 12.4%, 0 members

1992 election

GSLP - 73.1%, 8 members
GSD - 20.2%, 7 members
GNP - 4.7%, 0 members
AACR - 2.1%, 0 members

1996 election

GSD - 52.2%, 8 members
GSLP - 43.0%, 7 members
GNP - 4.7%, 0 members
Others - 0.2%

2000 election

GSD - 58.4%, 8 members
GSLP/Liberal Alliance - 40.6%, 7 members
Others - 1.0%, 0 members

2003 election

GSD - 51.5%, 8 members
GSLP/Liberal Alliance - 39.7%, 7 members
GLP - 8.3%

2007 election

GSD - 49.3%, 10 members
GSLP/Liberal Alliance - 45.5%, 7 members
PDP - 3.8%

NGD - 0.78%

2011 election

GSLP/Liberal Alliance - 48.88%, 10 members
GSD - 46.76% - 7 members
PDP - 4.36%

2015 election

GSLP/Liberal Alliance - 68.4%, 10 members
GSD - 31.6% - 7 members

Key
Note: Percentages can be misleading for parties with fewer than eight candidates
AACR = Association for the Advancement of Civil Rights (defunct)
DPBG = Democratic Party of British Gibraltar (defunct)
GLP = Gibraltar Labour Party (merged with the GSD in 2005)
 GNP = Gibraltar National Party (now termed 'Liberals' (LPG))
GDM = Gibraltar Democratic Movement (Now GSLP)
GSLP = Gibraltar Socialist Labour Party
GSD = Gibraltar Social Democrats
 PDP = Progressive Democratic Party (defunct)
 NGD = New Gibraltar Democracy (currently inactive)
IWBP = Integration with Britain Party (defunct)

UK elections
Unlike other overseas territories, Gibraltar has taken part as a UK counting area in three European elections and one UK-wide referendum as part of the South West England electoral region.
 2004 European Parliament election in Gibraltar
 2009 European Parliament election in Gibraltar
 2014 European Parliament election in Gibraltar
 European Union Referendum 2016 (Gibraltar)
 2019 European Parliament election in Gibraltar

Some people have advocated, including individual MPs, UKIP, the Liberal Democrats and the Gibraltar in Westminster Movement that Gibraltar should be extended the franchise of voting in UK general elections as a Westminster constituency.

See also
 Electoral calendar
 Electoral system

References

External links